Kevin Bruce Stevens (born 30 January 1987) is a South African professional rugby union player who last played for the  in the Currie Cup. His regular position is loosehead prop.

Career

Youth

Free State Cheetahs

He was named in the squad for the 2008 Vodacom Cup, but failed to make an appearance.

Griffons

He remained in Welkom for the next four years, playing regularly in the Vodacom Cup and Currie Cup competitions, making 72 appearances for the side. He helped the Griffons reach the semi-finals of the First Division for four years in a row between 2009 and 2012, although they never won it or appeared in the promotion play-off matches.

In 2012, he also made two appearances for Varsity Cup side .

Griquas

Return to Free State Cheetahs

He started in all their matches during the season, also scoring one try against  in Cape Town.

References

1987 births
Living people
People from Matjhabeng Local Municipality
White South African people
South African rugby union players
Free State Cheetahs players
Griffons (rugby union) players
Griquas (rugby union) players
Cheetahs (rugby union) players
Rugby union props
Alumni of Grey College, Bloemfontein
Rugby union players from the Free State (province)